Mauricio Talancón Rodríguez (born June 15, 1995, in Monterrey, Nuevo León) is a Mexican professional footballer who last played for Monterrey Premier.

References

External links
 
 

Living people
1995 births
Association football midfielders
C.F. Monterrey players
Liga MX players
Liga Premier de México players
Tercera División de México players
Footballers from Nuevo León
Sportspeople from Monterrey
Mexican footballers